Oreck is a surname. Notable people with the surname include:

Bruce J. Oreck (born 1953), American politician
David Oreck (1923–2023), American entrepreneur, business salesman, and lecturer, father of Bruce
Don Oreck (1930—2006), American actor
Sharon Oreck (born 1955), American film, music video and commercial producer

See also
Reck